Qucha Quchayuq Urqu (Quechua qucha lake, the reduplication indicates that there is a group or a complex of something, -yuq a suffix, urqu mountain, "a mountain with many lakes", also spelled Khocha Khochayoj Orkho) is a  mountain in the Bolivian Andes. It is located in the Cochabamba Department, the Carrasco Province, Pocona Municipality, near the border with the Arani Province, Vacas Municipality. Qucha Quchayuq Urqu lies on a ridge east of Vacas, southwest of Rumi Rumiyuq.

References 

Mountains of Cochabamba Department